The Environmental Protection Agency (EPA) is an independent executive agency of the United States federal government tasked with environmental protection matters. President Richard Nixon proposed the establishment of EPA on July 9, 1970; it began operation on December 2, 1970, after Nixon signed an executive order. The order establishing the EPA was ratified by committee hearings in the House and Senate. The agency is led by its administrator, who is appointed by the president and approved by the Senate. The current administrator is Michael S. Regan. The EPA is not a Cabinet department, but the administrator is normally given cabinet rank.
The EPA has its headquarters in Washington, D.C., regional offices for each of the agency's ten regions, and 27 laboratories. The agency conducts environmental assessment, research, and education. It has the responsibility of maintaining and enforcing national standards under a variety of environmental laws, in consultation with state, tribal, and local governments. It delegates some permitting, monitoring, and enforcement responsibility to U.S. states and the federally recognized tribes. EPA enforcement powers include fines, sanctions, and other measures. The agency also works with industries and all levels of government in a wide variety of voluntary pollution prevention programs and energy conservation efforts.
The agency's budgeted employee level in 2023 is 16,204.1 full-time equivalent (FTE). More than half of EPA's employees are engineers, scientists, and environmental protection specialists; other employees include legal, public affairs, financial, and information technologists.
Many public health and environmental groups advocate for the agency and believe that it is creating a better world. Other critics believe that the agency commits government overreach by adding unnecessary regulations on business and property owners.

History

Background

Beginning in the late 1950s and through the 1960s, Congress reacted to increasing public concern about the impact that human activity could have on the environment. Senator James E. Murray introduced a bill, the Resources and Conservation Act (RCA) of 1959, in the 86th Congress. The bill would have established a Council on Environmental Quality in the Executive Office of the President, declared a national environmental policy, and required the preparation of an annual environmental report.

The 1962 publication of Silent Spring by Rachel Carson alerted the public about the detrimental effects on the environment of the indiscriminate use of pesticides.

In the years following, similar bills were introduced and hearings were held to discuss the state of the environment and Congress's potential responses. In 1968, a joint House–Senate colloquium was convened by the chairmen of the Senate Committee on Interior and Insular Affairs, Senator Henry M. Jackson, and the House Committee on Science and Astronautics, Representative George P. Miller, to discuss the need for and means of implementing a national environmental policy. In the colloquium, some members of Congress expressed a continuing concern over federal agency actions affecting the environment.

The National Environmental Policy Act of 1969 (NEPA) was modeled on the 1959 RCA bill. President Nixon signed NEPA into law on January 1, 1970. The law created the Council on Environmental Quality (CEQ) in the Executive Office of the President. NEPA required that a detailed statement of environmental impacts be prepared for all major federal actions significantly affecting the environment. The "detailed statement" would ultimately be referred to as an environmental impact statement (EIS).

Establishment

On July 9, 1970, Nixon proposed an executive reorganization that consolidated many environmental responsibilities of the federal government under one agency, a new Environmental Protection Agency. This proposal included merging pollution control programs from a number of departments, such as the combination of pesticide programs from the United States Department of Agriculture and the United States Department of the Interior. After conducting hearings during that summer, the House and Senate approved the proposal. The EPA was created 90 days before it had to operate, and officially opened its doors on December 2, 1970. The agency's first administrator, William Ruckelshaus, took the oath of office on December 4, 1970.

EPA's primary predecessor was the former Environmental Health Divisions of the U.S. Public Health Service (PHS), and its creation caused one of a series of reorganizations of PHS that occurred during 1966–1973. From PHS, EPA absorbed the entire National Air Pollution Control Administration, as well as the Environmental Control Administration's Bureau of Solid Waste Management, Bureau of Water Hygiene, and part of its Bureau of Radiological Health. It also absorbed the Federal Water Quality Administration, which had previously been transferred from PHS to the Department of the Interior in 1966. A few functions from other agencies were also incorporated into EPA: the formerly independent Federal Radiation Council was merged into it; pesticides programs were transferred from the Department of the Interior, Food and Drug Administration, and Agricultural Research Service; and some functions were transferred from the Council on Environmental Quality and Atomic Energy Commission.

Upon its creation, EPA inherited 84 sites spread across 26 states, of which 42 sites were laboratories. The EPA consolidated these laboratories into 22 sites.

1970s
In its first year, the EPA had a budget of $1.4 billion and 5,800 employees. At its start, the EPA was primarily a technical assistance agency that set goals and standards. Soon, new acts and amendments passed by Congress gave the agency its regulatory authority. A major expansion of the Clean Air Act was approved in December 1970.

EPA staff recall that in the early days there was "an enormous sense of purpose and excitement" and the expectation that "there was this agency which was going to do something about a problem that clearly was on the minds of a lot of people in this country," leading to tens of thousands of resumes from those eager to participate in the mighty effort to clean up America's environment.

When EPA first began operation, members of the private sector felt strongly that the environmental protection movement was a passing fad. Ruckelshaus stated that he felt pressure to show a public which was deeply skeptical about government's effectiveness, that EPA could respond effectively to widespread concerns about pollution.

The burning Cuyahoga River in 1969 had led to a national outcry. In December 1970 a federal grand jury investigation led by U.S. Attorney Robert W. Jones began, of water pollution allegedly being caused by about 12 companies in northeastern Ohio. It was the first grand jury investigation of water pollution in the area. The attorney general of the United States, John N. Mitchell, held a press conference on December 18, 1970, referencing new pollution control litigation, with particular reference to work with the new Environmental Protection Agency, and announcing the filing of a lawsuit that morning against the Jones and Laughlin Steel Corporation for discharging substantial quantities of cyanide into the Cuyahoga River near Cleveland. Jones filed the misdemeanor charges in District Court, alleging violations of the Rivers and Harbors Act of 1899.

Partly based on such litigation experience, Congress enacted the Federal Water Pollution Control Act Amendments of 1972, better known as the Clean Water Act (CWA). The CWA established a national framework for addressing water quality, including mandatory pollution control standards, to be implemented by the agency in partnership with the states. Congress also amended the Federal Insecticide, Fungicide, and Rodenticide Act (FIFRA) in 1972, requiring EPA to measure every pesticide's risks against its potential benefits.

In 1973 President Nixon appointed Ruckelshaus to the position of Deputy Attorney General. Russell E. Train was appointed to be the next EPA Administrator.

Congress passed the Safe Drinking Water Act in 1974, requiring EPA to develop mandatory federal standards for all public water systems, which serve 90% of the US population. The law required EPA to enforce the standards with the cooperation of state agencies.

In October 1976, Congress passed the Toxic Substances Control Act (TSCA) which, like FIFRA, related to the manufacture, labeling and usage of commercial products rather than pollution. This act gave the EPA the authority to gather information on chemicals and require producers to test them, gave it the ability to regulate chemical production and use (with specific mention of PCBs), and required the agency to create the National Inventory listing of chemicals.

Congress also enacted the Resource Conservation and Recovery Act (RCRA) in 1976, significantly amending the Solid Waste Disposal Act of 1965. It tasked the EPA with setting national goals for waste disposal, conserving energy and natural resources, reducing waste, and ensuring environmentally sound management of waste. Accordingly, the agency developed regulations for solid and hazardous waste that were to be implemented in collaboration with states.

President Jimmy Carter appointed Douglas M. Costle as EPA Administrator in 1977.
To manage the agency's expanding legal mandates and workload, by the end of 1979 the budget grew to about $5.4 billion and the workforce size increased to about 13,000.

1980s
In 1980, following the discovery of many abandoned or mismanaged hazardous waste sites such as Love Canal, Congress passed the Comprehensive Environmental Response, Compensation, and Liability Act, nicknamed “Superfund.” The new law authorized EPA to cast a wider net for parties responsible for sites contaminated by previous hazardous waste disposal and established a funding mechanism for assessment and cleanup.

Anne Gorsuch was appointed EPA Administrator in 1981 by President Ronald Reagan. Gorsuch based her administration of EPA on the New Federalism approach of downsizing federal agencies by delegating their functions and services to the individual states. She believed that EPA was over-regulating business and that the agency was too large and not cost-effective. During her 22 months as agency head, she cut the budget of the EPA by 22%, reduced the number of cases filed against polluters, relaxed Clean Air Act regulations, and facilitated the spraying of restricted-use pesticides. She cut the total number of agency employees, and hired staff from the industries they were supposed to be regulating. Environmentalists contended that her policies were designed to placate polluters, and accused her of trying to dismantle the agency.

Following her mismanagement of the Superfund program, Assistant Administrator Rita Lavelle was fired by Reagan in February 1983. Lavelle was later convicted of perjury. Gorsuch had increasing confrontations with Congress over Superfund and other programs, including her refusal to submit subpoenaed documents. Gorsuch was cited for contempt of Congress and the White House directed EPA to submit the documents to Congress. Gorsuch (who had recently remarried, becoming Anne Gorsuch Burford) resigned in March 1983, followed by resignations of her Deputy Administrator and most of her Assistant Administrators. Reagan then appointed William Ruckelshaus as EPA Administrator for a second term. Lee M. Thomas succeeded Ruckelshaus as Administrator in 1985.

In April 1986, when the Chernobyl disaster occurred in Ukraine, the EPA was tasked with identifying any impacts on the United States and keeping the public informed. Administrator Lee Thomas assembled an interagency team, including personnel from the Nuclear Regulatory Commission, National Oceanic and Atmospheric Administration, and the Department of Energy to monitor the situation. They held press conferences for 10 days. That same year Congress passed the Emergency Planning and Community Right-to-Know Act, which authorized the EPA to gather data on toxic chemicals and share this information with the public.

EPA also researched the implications of stratospheric ozone depletion. Under Administrator Thomas, EPA joined with several international organizations to perform a risk assessment of stratospheric ozone, which helped provide motivation for the Montreal Protocol, which was agreed to in August 1987.

In 1988, during his first presidential campaign, George H. W. Bush was vocal about environmental issues. Following his election victory, he appointed William K. Reilly, an environmentalist, as EPA Administrator in 1989. Under Reilly's leadership, the EPA implemented voluntary programs and initiated the development of a "cluster rule" for multimedia regulation of the pulp and paper industry. At the time, the environment was increasingly being recognized as a regional issue, which was reflected in 1990 amendment of the Clean Air Act and new approaches by the agency.

1990s
In 1992 EPA and the Department of Energy launched the Energy Star program, a voluntary program that fosters energy efficiency.

Carol Browner was appointed EPA Administrator by President Bill Clinton and served from 1993 to 2001. Major projects during Browner's term included:
 Initiation of the Brownfields pilot program in 1995
 Initial hazardous air pollution standards for petroleum refineries in 1995
 Initial lead paint abatement regulations under TSCA in 1996
 Update of the National Ambient Air Quality Standards for particulate matter and ozone in 1997.

Since the passage of the Superfund law in 1980, an excise tax had been levied on the chemical and petroleum industries, to support the cleanup trust fund. Congressional authorization of the tax was due to expire in 1995. Although Browner and the Clinton Administration supported continuation of the tax, Congress declined to reauthorize it. Subsequently, the Superfund program has been supported only by annual appropriations, greatly reducing the number of waste sites that are remediated in a given year. (In 2021 Congress reauthorized an excise tax on chemical manufacturers.)

Major legislative updates during the Clinton Administration were the Food Quality Protection Act and the 1996 amendments to the Safe Drinking Water Act.

2000s
President George W. Bush appointed Christine Todd Whitman as EPA Administrator in 2001. Whitman was succeeded by Mike Leavitt in 2003 and Stephen L. Johnson in 2005.

In March 2005 nine states (California, New York, New Jersey, New Hampshire, Massachusetts, Maine, Connecticut, New Mexico and Vermont) sued the EPA. The EPA's inspector general had determined that the EPA's regulation of mercury emissions did not follow the Clean Air Act, and that the regulations were influenced by top political appointees. The EPA had suppressed a study it commissioned by Harvard University which contradicted its position on mercury controls. The suit alleged that the EPA's rule exempting coal-fired power plants from "maximum available control technology" was illegal, and additionally charged that the EPA's system of cap-and-trade to lower average mercury levels would allow power plants to forego reducing mercury emissions, which they objected would lead to dangerous local hotspots of mercury contamination even if average levels declined. Several states also began to enact their own mercury emission regulations. Illinois's proposed rule would have reduced mercury emissions from power plants by an average of 90% by 2009. In 2008—by which point a total of fourteen states had joined the suit—the U.S. Court of Appeals for the District of Columbia ruled that the EPA regulations violated the Clean Air Act. In response, EPA announced plans to propose such standards to replace the vacated Clean Air Mercury Rule, and did so on March 16, 2011.

In July 2005 an EPA report showing that auto companies were using loopholes to produce less fuel-efficient cars was delayed. The report was supposed to be released the day before a controversial energy bill was passed and would have provided backup for those opposed to it, but the EPA delayed its release at the last minute.

EPA initiated its voluntary WaterSense program in 2006 to encourage water efficiency through the use of a special label on consumer products.

In 2007 the state of California sued the EPA for its refusal to allow California and 16 other states to raise fuel economy standards for new cars. EPA Administrator Stephen Johnson claimed that the EPA was working on its own standards, but the move has been widely considered an attempt to shield the auto industry from environmental regulation by setting lower standards at the federal level, which would then preempt state laws. California governor Arnold Schwarzenegger, along with governors from 13 other states, stated that the EPA's actions ignored federal law, and that existing California standards (adopted by many states in addition to California) were almost twice as effective as the proposed federal standards. It was reported that Johnson ignored his own staff in making this decision.

In 2007 it was reported that EPA research was suppressed by career managers. Supervisors at EPA's National Center for Environmental Assessment required several paragraphs to be deleted from a peer-reviewed journal article about EPA's integrated risk information system, which led two co-authors to have their names removed from the publication, and the corresponding author, Ching-Hung Hsu, to leave EPA "because of the draconian restrictions placed on publishing". The 2007 report stated that EPA subjected employees who author scientific papers to prior restraint, even if those papers are written on personal time.
In December 2007 EPA Administrator Johnson approved a draft of a document that declared that climate change imperiled the public welfare—a decision that would trigger the first national mandatory global-warming regulations. Associate Deputy Administrator Jason Burnett e-mailed the draft to the White House. White House aides—who had long resisted mandatory regulations as a way to address climate change—knew the gist of what Johnson's finding would be, Burnett said. They also knew that once they opened the attachment, it would become a public record, making it controversial and difficult to rescind. So they did not open it; rather, they called Johnson and asked him to take back the draft. Johnson rescinded the draft; in July 2008, he issued a new version which did not state that global warming was danger to public welfare. Burnett resigned in protest.

In April 2008, the Union of Concerned Scientists said that more than half of the nearly 1,600 EPA staff scientists who responded online to a detailed questionnaire reported they had experienced incidents of political interference in their work. The survey included chemists, toxicologists, engineers, geologists and experts in other fields of science. About 40% of the scientists reported that the interference had been more prevalent in the last five years than in previous years.

President Barack Obama appointed Lisa P. Jackson as EPA Administrator in 2009.

2010s
In 2010 it was reported that a $3 million mapping study on sea level rise was suppressed by EPA management during both the Bush and Obama administrations, and managers changed a key interagency report to reflect the removal of the maps.

Between 2011 and 2012, some EPA employees reported difficulty in conducting and reporting the results of studies on hydraulic fracturing due to industry and governmental pressure, and were concerned about the censorship of environmental reports.

President Obama appointed Gina McCarthy as EPA Administrator in 2013.

In 2014, the EPA published its "Tier 3" standards for cars, trucks and other motor vehicles, which tightened air pollution emission requirements and lowered the sulfur content in gasoline.

In 2015, the EPA discovered extensive violations by Volkswagen Group in its manufacture of Volkswagen and Audi diesel engine cars, for the 2009 through 2016 model years. Following notice of violations and potential criminal sanctions, Volkswagen later agreed to a legal settlement and paid billions of US dollars in criminal penalties, and was required to initiate a vehicle buyback program and modify the engines of the vehicles to reduce illegal air emissions.

In August 2015, the 2015 Gold King Mine waste water spill occurred when EPA contractors examined the level of pollutants such as lead and arsenic in a Colorado mine, and accidentally released over three million gallons of waste water into Cement Creek and the Animas River.
In 2015, the International Agency for Research on Cancer (IARC), a branch of the World Health Organization, cited research linking glyphosate, an ingredient of the weed killer Roundup manufactured by the chemical company Monsanto, to non-Hodgkin's lymphoma. In March 2017, the presiding judge in a litigation brought about by people who claim to have developed glyphosate-related non-Hodgkin's lymphoma opened Monsanto emails and other documents related to the case, including email exchanges between the company and federal regulators. According to The New York Times, the "records suggested that Monsanto had ghostwritten research that was later attributed to academics and indicated that a senior official at the Environmental Protection Agency had worked to quash a review of Roundup’s main ingredient, glyphosate, that was to have been conducted by the United States Department of Health and Human Services." The records show that Monsanto was able to prepare "a public relations assault" on the finding after they were alerted to the determination by Jess Rowland, the head of the EPA's cancer assessment review committee at that time, months in advance. Emails also showed that Rowland "had promised to beat back an effort by the Department of Health and Human Services to conduct its own review."

On February 17, 2017, President Donald Trump appointed Scott Pruitt as EPA Administrator. The Democratic Party saw the appointment as a controversial move, as Pruitt had spent most of his career challenging environmental regulations and policies. He did not have previous experience in the environmental protection field and had received financial support from the fossil fuel industry. In 2017, the Trump administration proposed a 31% cut to the EPA's budget to $5.7 billion from $8.1 billion and to eliminate a quarter of the agency jobs. However, this cut was not approved by Congress. Pruitt resigned from the position on July 5, 2018, citing "unrelenting attacks" due to ongoing ethics controversies.

President Trump appointed Andrew R. Wheeler as EPA Administrator in 2019.

On July 17, 2019, EPA management prohibited the agency's Scientific Integrity Official, Francesca Grifo, from testifying at a House committee hearing. EPA offered to send a different representative in place of Grifo and accused the committee of "dictating to the agency who they believe was qualified to speak." The hearing was to discuss the importance of allowing federal scientists and other employees to speak freely when and to whom they want to about their research without having to worry about any political consequences.

In September 2019 air pollution standards in California were once again under attack, as the Trump administration attempted to revoke a waiver issued to the state which allowed more stringent standards for auto and truck emissions than the federal standards.

2020s 
President Joe Biden appointed Michael S. Regan to be Administrator in 2021. Regan began serving on March 11, 2021.

In October 2021 EPA announced its "PFAS Strategic Roadmap." PFASs are organofluorine chemical compounds referred to as "forever chemicals". The roadmap is a "whole-of-EPA" strategy and the agency will consider the full life cycle of PFAS, including preventing PFAS from entering the environment, holding polluters accountable, and remediation of contaminated sites. It also will include drinking water monitoring and risk assessment for PFOA and PFOS in biosolids (processed sewage sludge used as fertilizer).

In December 2021 EPA issued new greenhouse gas standards for passenger cars and light trucks. The standards, which will reduce climate pollution and improve public health, became effective for the 2023 vehicle model year.

In March 2022 the Biden administration allowed California to again set stricter auto emissions standards.

In August 2022 the EPA was allotted a listed ~$53.216 billion in funding pursuant to the Inflation Reduction Act (IRA). The EPA listed 24 total initiatives, the most notable among them being greenhouse gas reduction and monitoring, a superfund petroleum tax, replacing current heavy-duty vehicles with zero-emission vehicles, and a methane incentive program.

On February 3, 2023, more than 100 train cars were derailed in East Palestine, and around half of those cars containing chemicals like butyl acrylate, vinyl chloride, and ethylhexyl acrylate. Subsequently, the chemicals combusted into a flame being seen from miles around and the fumes filled the air with residents reporting animals falling ill and a burning sensation in their eyes and nose. The EPA is monitoring the situation and experts recommend that local residents take part in the EPA's at-home air screening.

Organization

The EPA is led by the administrator, appointed following nomination by the president and approval from Congress.

Offices
 Office of the Administrator (OA). , the office consisted of 12 divisions:
 Office of Administrative and Executive Services
 Office of Children's Health Protection
 Children's Health Protection Advisory Committee
 Office of Civil Rights
 Office of Congressional and Intergovernmental Relations
 Office of Continuous Improvement
 Office of the Executive Secretariat
 Office of Homeland Security
 Office of Policy
 Office of Public Affairs
 Office of Public Engagement and Environmental Education
 Office of Small and Disadvantaged Business Utilization
 Science Advisory Board
 Office of Air and Radiation (OAR)
 Office of Chemical Safety and Pollution Prevention (OCSPP)
 Office of the Chief Financial Officer (OCFO)
 Office of Environmental Justice and External Civil Rights
 Office of Enforcement and Compliance Assurance (OECA)
 Office of General Counsel (OGC)
 Office of Inspector General (OIG)
 Office of International and Tribal Affairs (OITA)
 Office of Mission Support (OMS)
 Office of Resources and Business Operations (ORBO)
 Environmental Appeals Board
 Office of Federal Sustainability
 Office of Administrative Law Judges
 Office of Acquisition Solutions (OAS)
 Office of Administration (OA)
 Office of Human Resources (OHR)
 Office of Grants and Debarment (OGD)
 Office of Customer Advocacy, Policy and Portfolio Management (OCAPPM)
 Office of Digital Services and Technical Architecture (ODSTA)
 Office of Information Management (OIM)Office of Information Security and Privacy (OISP)
 Office of Enterprise Information Programs (OEIP)
 Office of IT Operations (OITO)

 Immediate Office of the Assistant Administrator
 Office of Science Advisor, Policy, and Engagement (OSAPE)
 Office of Science Information Management (OSIM)
 Office of Resource Management
 Center for Computational Toxicology and Exposure (CCTE)
 Center for Environmental Measurement and Modeling (CEMM)
 Center for Public Health and Environmental Assessment (CPHEA)
 Center for Environmental Solutions and Emergency Response (CESER)
 Office of Superfund Remediation and Technology Innovation
 Office of Resource Conservation and Recovery
 Office of Underground Storage Tanks
 Office of Brownfields and Land Revitalization
 Office of Emergency Management
 Federal Facilities Restoration and Reuse Office
 Office of Water (OW) which, consisted of:
 Office of Ground Water and Drinking Water (OGWDW)
 Office of Science and Technology (OST)
 Office of Wastewater Management (OWM)
 Office of Wetlands, Oceans and Watersheds (OWOW)

Regions

Creating 10 EPA regions was an initiative that came from President Richard Nixon. See Standard Federal Regions.
Each EPA regional office is responsible within its states for implementing the agency's programs, except those programs that have been specifically delegated to states.
 Region 1: responsible within the states of Connecticut, Maine, Massachusetts, New Hampshire, Rhode Island, and Vermont (New England).
 Region 2: responsible within the states of New Jersey and New York. It is also responsible for the US territories of Puerto Rico, and the U.S. Virgin Islands.
 Region 3: responsible within the states of Delaware, Maryland, Pennsylvania, Virginia, West Virginia, and the District of Columbia.
 Region 4: responsible within the states of Alabama, Florida, Georgia, Kentucky, Mississippi, North Carolina, South Carolina, and Tennessee.
 Region 5: responsible within the states of Illinois, Indiana, Michigan, Minnesota, Ohio, and Wisconsin.
 Region 6: responsible within the states of Arkansas, Louisiana, New Mexico, Oklahoma, and Texas.
 Region 7: responsible within the states of Iowa, Kansas, Missouri, and Nebraska.
 Region 8: responsible within the states of Colorado, Montana, North Dakota, South Dakota, Utah, and Wyoming.
 Region 9: responsible within the states of Arizona, California, Hawaii, Nevada, the territories of Guam and American Samoa, and the Navajo Nation.
 Region 10: responsible within the states of Alaska, Idaho, Oregon, and Washington.
Each regional office also implements programs on Indian Tribal lands, except those programs delegated to tribal authorities.

Legal authority
The Environmental Protection Agency can only act pursuant to statutes—the laws passed by Congress. Appropriations statutes authorize how much money the agency can spend each year to carry out the approved statutes. The agency has the power to issue regulations. A regulation interprets a statute, and EPA applies its regulations to various environmental situations and enforces the requirements. The agency must include a rationale of why a regulation is needed. (See Administrative Procedure Act.) Regulations can be challenged in federal courts, either district court or appellate court, depending on the particular statutory provision.

Related legislation
EPA has principal implementation authority for the following federal environmental laws:
 Clean Air Act
 Clean Water Act
 Comprehensive Environmental Response, Compensation and Liability Act ("Superfund")
 Emergency Planning and Community Right-to-Know Act
 Federal Insecticide, Fungicide, and Rodenticide Act
 Resource Conservation and Recovery Act
 Safe Drinking Water Act
 Toxic Substances Control Act
 Frank R. Lautenberg Chemical Safety for the 21st Century Act
There are additional laws where EPA has a contributing role or provides assistance to other agencies. Among these laws are:
 Endangered Species Act
 Energy Independence and Security Act
 Energy Policy Act
 Federal Food, Drug, and Cosmetic Act
 Food Quality Protection Act
 National Environmental Policy Act
 Oil Pollution Act
 Pollution Prevention Act

Programs

EPA established its major programs pursuant to the primary missions originally articulated in the laws passed by Congress. Additional programs have been developed to interpret the primary missions. Some of the newer programs have been specifically authorized by Congress. Former Administrator William Ruckelshaus observed in 2016 that a danger for EPA was that air, water, waste and other programs would be unconnected, placed in "silos", a problem that persists more than 50 years later, albeit less so than at the start.

Core programs

Air quality and radiation protection
The Office of Air and Radiation (OAR) describes itself as the official authority in charge of "developing national programs, policies, and regulations for controlling air pollution and radiation exposure." The OAR is responsible for enforcing the Clean Air Act, the Atomic Energy Act, the Waste Isolation Pilot Plant Land Withdrawal Act, and other applicable laws. The OAR is in charge of the Offices of Air Quality Planning and Standards, Atmospheric Protection, Transportation and Air Quality, and the Office of Radiation and Indoor Air.

Ambient standards
 National Ambient Air Quality Standards (NAAQS)
 State Implementation Plans (SIPs)

Stationary air pollution source standards
 New Source Performance Standards
 National Emissions Standards for Hazardous Air Pollutants (NESHAPs)
 Permits for industrial and commercial sources

Mobile source standards

 On-road vehicles regulation
 Non-road vehicle regulation (including aircraft, locomotives, marine transport, stationary engines)
 Transportation fuel controls
 National Vehicle Fuel and Emissions Laboratory (NVFEL)

Radiation protection
The Radiation Protection Program comprises seven project groups.
 Radioactive Waste
 Emergency Preparedness and Response Programs Protective Action Guides And Planning Guidance for Radiological Incidents: EPA developed a manual as guideline for local and state governments to protect the public from a nuclear accident, the 2017 version being a 15-year update.
 EPA's Role in Emergency Response – Special Teams
 Technologically Enhanced Naturally Occurring Radioactive Materials (TENORM) Program
 Radiation Standards for Air and Drinking Water Programs
 Federal Guidance for Radiation Protection

Water quality

Science and regulatory standards
 The National Pollutant Discharge Elimination System (NPDES) permit program addresses water pollution by regulating point sources which discharge to US waters. Created in 1972 by the Clean Water Act, the NPDES permit program authorizes state governments to perform its many permitting, administrative, and enforcement aspects. , the EPA has approved 47 states to administer all or portions of the permit program. EPA regional offices manage the program in the remaining areas of the country. The Water Quality Act of 1987 extended NPDES permit coverage to industrial stormwater dischargers and municipal separate storm sewer systems. In 2016, there were 6,700 major point source NPDES permits in place and 109,000 municipal and industrial point sources with general or individual permits.

 Effluent guidelines (technology based standards) for industrial point sources and Water quality standards (risk-based standards) for water bodies, under Title III of the CWA
 Nonpoint source pollution programs
 The CWA Section 404 Program regulates the discharge of dredged or fill material into waters of the United States. Permits are issued by the U.S. Army Corps of Engineers and reviewed by EPA, and may be denied if they would cause unacceptable degradation or if an alternative does not exist that does not also have adverse impacts on waters. Permit holders are typically required to restore or create wetlands or other waters to offset losses that cannot be avoided.
 EPA ensures safe drinking water for the public, by setting standards for more than 148,000 public water systems nationwide. EPA oversees states, local governments and water suppliers to enforce the standards under the Safe Drinking Water Act. The program includes regulation of injection wells in order to protect underground sources of drinking water.

Infrastructure financing
 The Clean Water State Revolving Fund provides grants to states which, along with matching state funds, are loaned to municipalities for wastewater and "green" infrastructure at below-market interest rates. These loans are expected to be paid back, creating revolving loan funds. Cumulative assistance from the revolving fund has surpassed US$153.6 billion . The revolving fund replaced the Construction Grants Program, which was phased out in 1990.
 The Drinking Water State Revolving Fund provides financial assistance to local drinking water utilities.

Land, waste and cleanup
 Regulation of solid waste (non-hazardous) and hazardous waste under RCRA. To implement the 1976 law, EPA published standards in 1979 for "sanitary" landfills that receive municipal solid waste. The agency published national hazardous waste regulations and established a nationwide permit and tracking system for managing hazardous waste. The system is largely managed by state agencies under EPA authorization. Standards were issued for waste treatment, storage and disposal facilities (TSDFs), and ocean dumping of waste was prohibited. In 1984 Congress passed the Hazardous and Solid Waste Amendments (HSWA) which expanded several aspects of the RCRA program:
 The Land Disposal Restrictions Program sets treatment requirements for hazardous waste before it may be disposed on land. EPA began issuing treatment methods and levels of requirements in 1986 and these are continually adapted to new hazardous wastes and treatment technologies. The stringent requirements it sets and its emphasis on waste minimization practices encourage businesses to plan to minimize waste generation and prioritize reuse and recycling. From the start of the program in 1984 to 2004, the volume of hazardous waste disposed in landfills had decreased 94% and the volume of hazardous waste disposed of by underground injection had decreased 70%.
 The RCRA Corrective Action Program requires TSDFs to investigate and clean up hazardous releases at their own expense. In the 1980s, EPA estimated that the number of sites needing cleanup was three times more than the number of sites on the national Superfund list. The program is largely implemented through permits and orders. , the program has led to the cleanup of 18 million acres of land, of which facilities were primarily responsible for cleanup costs. The goal of EPA and states is to complete final remedies by 2020 at 3,779 priority facilities out of 6,000 that need to be cleaned up, according to EPA.
 Beginning in the mid-1980s EPA developed standards for small quantity generators of hazardous waste, pursuant to HSWA.
 EPA was mandated to conduct a review of landfill conditions nationwide. The agency reported in 1988 that the effectiveness of environmental controls at landfills varied nationwide, which could lead to serious contamination of groundwater and surface waters. EPA published a national plan in 1989 calling for state and local governments to better integrate their municipal solid waste management practices with source reduction and recycling programs.
 Regulation of Underground Storage Tanks. The Underground Storage Tank (UST) Program was launched in 1985 and covers about 553,000 active USTs containing petroleum and hazardous chemicals. Since 1984, 1.8 million USTs have been closed in compliance with regulations. 38 states, the District of Columbia and Puerto Rico manage UST programs with EPA authorization. When the program began, EPA had only 90 staff to develop a system to regulate more than 2 million tanks and work with 750,000 owners and operators. The program relies more on local operations and enforcement than other EPA programs. Today, the program supports the inspection of all federally regulated tanks, cleans up old and new leaks, minimizes potential leaks, and encourages sustainable reuse of abandoned gas stations.
 Hazardous site cleanup. In the late 1970s, the need to clean up sites such as Love Canal that had been highly contaminated by previous hazardous waste disposal became apparent. However the existing regulatory environment depended on owners or operators to perform environmental control. While the EPA attempted to use RCRA's section 7003 to perform this cleanup, it was clear a new law was needed. In 1980, Congress passed the Comprehensive Environmental Response, Compensation, and Liability Act (CERCLA), commonly known as "Superfund". This law enabled the EPA to cast a wider net for responsible parties, including past or present generators and transporters as well as current and past owners of the site to find funding. The act also established some funding and a tax mechanism on certain industries to help fund such cleanup. Congress did not renew the Superfund tax in the 1990s, and subsequently funding for cleanup actions was supported only by general appropriations. Congress restored an excise tax on chemical manufacturers in 2021, which will eventually increase the available budget for site cleanups. Today, due to restricted funding, most cleanup activities are performed by responsible parties under the oversight of the EPA and states. , more than 1,700 sites had been put on the cleanup list since the creation of the program. Of these, 370 sites have been cleaned up and removed from the list, cleanup is underway at 535, cleanup facilities have been constructed at 790 but need to be operated in the future, and 54 are not yet in cleanup stage.
 EPA's oil spill prevention program includes the Spill Prevention, Control, and Countermeasure (SPCC) and the Facility Response Plan (FRP) rules. The SPCC Rule applies to all facilities that store, handle, process, gather, transfer, refine, distribute, use or consume oil or oil products. Oil products includes petroleum and non-petroleum oils as well as: animal fats, oils and greases; fish and marine mammal oils; and vegetable oils. It mandates a written plan for facilities that store more than 1,320 gallons of fuel above ground or more than 42,000 gallons below-ground, and which might discharge to navigable waters (as defined in the Clean Water Act) or adjoining shorelines. Secondary spill containment is mandated at oil storage facilities and oil release containment is required at oil development sites.

Chemical manufacture and usage
 EPA regulates pesticides under the Federal Insecticide, Fungicide, and Rodenticide Act (FIFRA) and the Food Quality Protection Act. The agency assesses, registers, regulates, and regularly reevaluates all pesticides legally sold in the United States. A few challenges this program faces are transforming toxicity testing, screening pesticides for endocrine disruptors, and regulating biotechnology and nanotechnology.
 TSCA required EPA to create and maintain a national inventory of all existing chemicals in U.S. commerce. When the act was passed in 1976, there were more than 60,000 chemicals on the market that had never been comprehensively cataloged. To do so, the EPA developed and implemented procedures that have served as a model for Canada, Japan, and the European Union. For the inventory, the EPA also established a baseline for new chemicals that the agency should be notified about before being commercially manufactured. Today, this rule keeps the EPA updated on volumes, uses, and exposures of around 7,000 of the highest-volume chemicals via industry reporting.
 The Toxics Release Inventory (TRI) is a resource established by the Emergency Planning and Community Right-to-Know Act specifically for the public to learn about toxic chemical releases and pollution prevention activities reported by industrial and federal facilities. TRI data support informed decision-making by communities, government agencies, companies, and others. Annually, the agency collects data from more than 20,000 facilities. The EPA has generated a range of tools to support the use of this inventory, including interactive maps and online databases such as ChemView.

Enforcement

 Civil enforcement and criminal enforcement programs. EPA develops and prosecutes administrative civil and judicial cases and provides legal support for cases and investigations initiated in its regional offices. Federal judicial actions (formal lawsuits) are filed by the U.S. Department of Justice on behalf of EPA.
 Compliance assistance. EPA identifies, prevents, and reduces noncompliance and environmental risks by establishing enforcement initiatives and ensuring effective monitoring and assessment of compliance.
 Federal facilities enforcement
 Environmental Justice program
In 2019 the Environmental Data & Governance Initiative, "a network of academics, developers, and non-profit professionals", published a report which compared EPA enforcement statistics over time. The number of civil cases filed by EPA have gradually decreased, and in 2018 the criminal and civil penalties from EPA claims dropped over four times their amounts in 2013, 2016, and 2017. In 2016 EPA issued $6,307,833,117 in penalties due to violations of agency requirements, and in 2018 the agency issued $184,768,000 in penalties. EPA's inspections and evaluations have steadily decreased from 2015 to 2018. Enforcement activity has decreased partially due to budget cuts within the agency.

Additional programs
 The EPA Safer Choice label, previously known as the "Design for the Environment" (DfE) label, helps consumers and commercial buyers identify and select products with safer chemical ingredients, without sacrificing quality or performance. When a product has the Safer Choice label, it means that every intentionally-added ingredient in the product has been evaluated by EPA scientists. Only the safest possible functional ingredients are allowed in products with the Safer Choice label.
 Through the Safer Detergents Stewardship Initiative (SDSI), EPA's Design for the Environment (DfE) recognizes environmental leaders who voluntarily commit to the use of safer surfactants. Safer surfactants are the ones that break down quickly to non-polluting compounds and help protect aquatic life in both fresh and salt water. Nonylphenol ethoxylates, commonly referred to as NPEs, are an example of a surfactant class that does not meet the definition of a safer surfactant. The Safer Choice program identified safer alternative surfactants through partnerships with industry and environmental advocates. These alternatives are comparable in cost and are readily available. The CleanGredients website  is an information source about safer surfactants.
 The Energy Star program, initiated in 1992, motivated major companies to retrofit millions of square feet of building space with more efficient lighting. , more than 40,000 Energy Star products were available including major appliances, office equipment, lighting, home electronics, and more. In addition, the label can also be found on new homes and commercial and industrial buildings. In 2006, about 12 percent of new housing in the US displayed an Energy Star label. EPA estimates that the program saved about $14 billion in energy costs in 2006 alone. The program has helped spread the use of LED traffic lights, efficient fluorescent lighting, power management systems for office equipment, and low standby energy use.
 EPA's Smart Growth Program began in 1998 and was created to help communities improve their land development practices and get the type of development they want. Together with local, state, and national experts, EPA encourages development strategies that protect human health and the environment, create economic opportunities, and provide attractive and affordable neighborhoods for people of all income levels.
 The Brownfields Program started as a pilot program in the 1990s and was authorized by law in 2002. The program provides grants and tools to local governments for the assessment, cleanup, and revitalization of brownfields. , the EPA estimates that program grants have resulted in 56,442 acres of land readied for reuse and leveraged 116,963 jobs and $24.2 billion to do so. Agency studies also found that property values around assessed or cleaned-up brownfields have increased 5.1 to 12.8 percent.
 EPA's Indoor Air Quality Tools for Schools Program helps schools to maintain a healthy environment and reduce exposures to indoor environmental contaminants. It helps school personnel identify, solve, and prevent indoor air quality problems in the school environment. Through the use of a multi-step management plan and checklists for the entire building, schools can lower their students' and staff's risk of exposure to asthma triggers.
 The National Environmental Education Act of 1990 requires EPA to provide national leadership to increase environmental literacy. EPA established the Office of Environmental Education to implement this program.
 Clean School Bus USA is a national partnership to reduce children's exposure to diesel exhaust by eliminating unnecessary school bus idling, installing effective emission control systems on newer buses and replacing the oldest buses in the fleet with newer ones. Its goal is to reduce both children's exposure to diesel exhaust and the amount of air pollution created by diesel school buses.
 The Green Chemistry Program encourages the development of products and processes that follow green chemistry principles. It has recognized more than 100 winning technologies. These reduce the use or creation of hazardous chemicals, save water, and reduce greenhouse gas release.
 The Beaches Environmental Assessment and Coastal Health (BEACH) Act, was authorized in a 2000 amendment to the Clean Water Act. The program focus is on coastal recreational waters, and requires EPA to develop criteria to test and monitor waters and notify public users of any concerns. The program involves states, local beach resource managers, and the agency in assessing risks of stormwater and wastewater overflows and enables better sampling, analytical methods, and communication with the public.
 The EPA has also established specific geographic programs for particular water resources such as the Chesapeake Bay Program, the National Estuary Program, and the Gulf of Mexico Program.
 Advance identification, or ADID, is a planning process used by the EPA to identify wetlands and other bodies of water and their respective suitability for the discharge of dredged and fill material. The EPA conducts the process in cooperation with the U.S. Army Corps of Engineers and local states or Native American Tribes. , 38 ADID projects had been completed, and 33 were ongoing.
 EPA's "One Cleanup Program" initiative was designed to improve coordination across different agency programs that have a role in cleanup at a particular site. The coordination efforts apply to the brownfields, federal facilities, USTs, RCRA and Superfund programs.
 EPA reviews environmental impact statements prepared by other agencies and maintains a national EIS filing system.

Past programs
 The former Construction Grants Program distributed federal grants for the construction of municipal wastewater treatment works from 1972 to 1990. While such grants existed before the 1972, the 1972 CWA expanded these grants dramatically. They were distributed through 1990, when the program and funding were replaced with the State Revolving Loan Fund Program.
 In 1991 under Administrator William Reilly, the EPA implemented its voluntary 33/50 program. This was designed to encourage, recognize, and celebrate companies that voluntarily found ways to prevent and reduce pollution in their operations. Specifically, it challenged industry to reduce Toxic Release Inventory emissions of 17 priority chemicals by 33% in one year and 50% in four years. These results were achieved before the commitment deadlines.
 Launched in 2006, the voluntary 2010/2015 PFOA Stewardship Program worked with eight major companies to voluntarily reduce their global emissions of certain types of perfluorinated chemicals by 95% by 2010 and eliminate these emissions by 2015.

 In March 2004, the U.S. Navy transferred USNS Bold (T-AGOS-12), a Stalwart class ocean surveillance ship, to the EPA. The ship had been used in anti-submarine operations during the Cold War, was equipped with sidescan sonar, underwater video, water and sediment sampling instruments used in study of ocean and coastline. One of the major missions of the Bold was to monitor for ecological impact sites where materials were dumped from dredging operations in U.S. ports. In 2013, the General Services Administration sold the Bold to Seattle Central Community College (SCCC), which demonstrated in a competition that they would put it to the highest and best purpose, at a nominal cost of $5,000.

Controversies

Scope and fulfillment of agency's authority
Congress enacted laws such as the Clean Air Act, the Resource Conservation and Recovery Act, and CERCLA with the intent of preventing and reconciling environmental damages. Beginning in 2018 under Administrator Andrew Wheeler, EPA revised some pollution standards that resulted in less overall regulation.
Furthermore, the CAA's discretionary application has caused a varied application of the law among states. In 1970, Louisiana deployed its Comprehensive Toxic Air Pollutant Emission Control Program to comply with federal law. This program does not require pollution monitoring that is equivalent to programs in other states.

Environmental justice
The EPA has been criticized for its lack of progress towards environmental justice. Administrator Christine Todd Whitman was criticized for her changes to President Bill Clinton's Executive Order 12898 during 2001, removing the requirements for government agencies to take the poor and minority populations into special consideration when making changes to environmental legislation, and therefore defeating the spirit of the Executive Order. In a March 2004 report, the inspector general of the agency concluded that the EPA "has not developed a clear vision or a comprehensive strategic plan, and has not established values, goals, expectations, and performance measurements" for environmental justice in its daily operations. Another report in September 2006 found the agency still had failed to review the success of its programs, policies, and activities toward environmental justice. Studies have also found that poor and minority populations were underserved by the EPA's Superfund program, and that this situation was worsening.
In August 2022 the EPA was allotted a listed ~42.8 billion in funding from the Inflation Reduction Act (IRA) towards what the EPA classifies as "Advancing Environmental Justice", and published the statement "Through the Inflation Reduction Act, EPA will improve the lives of millions of Americans by reducing pollution in neighborhoods where people live, work, play, and go to school; accelerating environmental justice efforts in communities overburdened by pollution for far too long; and tackling our biggest climate challenges while creating jobs and delivering energy security."
In September 2022 EPA announced the creation of a new Office of Environmental Justice and External Civil Rights that reports directly to the EPA administrator. The new office has an expanded budget and staff with broader responsibilities than under the previous organizational arrangement.

Freedom of Information Act processing performance
In the latest Center for Effective Government analysis of 15 federal agencies which receive the most Freedom of Information Act (FOIA) requests, published in 2015 (using 2012 and 2013 data, the most recent years available), the EPA earned a D by scoring 67 out of a possible 100 points, i.e. did not earn a satisfactory overall grade.

Pebble Mine 
Pebble Mine is a copper and gold mining project located in the southwest region of Alaska in the Bristol Bay region organized by Northern Dynasty Minerals. In 2014 the EPA released its statement on the impacts that mining would have on Bristol Bay and its tributaries. Among many things, the statement assesses geological, topographic, ecological, hydrological, and economic data and determined that mining could negatively impact the salmon population. Seeing as Bristol Bay and its watershed provides around 46% of the world's sockeye salmon, the EPA did not want to risk an ecological disaster. In July 2014, before Northern Dynasty Minerals had submitted its EIS, EPA's Region 10 office proposed restrictions pursuant to section 404(c) of the Clean Water Act, restrictions that would effectively prohibit the project. Northern Dynasty Minerals protested this decision and on July 18, 2014, in a published statement, Pebble Partnership CEO Tom Collier said that the project would continue its litigation against EPA; noted that the EPA's action was under investigation by the EPA inspector general and by the House Committee on Oversight and Government Reform; and noted that two bills were pending in Congress seeking to clarify that EPA did not have the authority to preemptively veto or otherwise restrict development projects prior to the onset of federal and state permitting. Collier's statement also said that EPA's proposal was based on outdated mining scenarios that were not part of the project's approach. Multiple journalists and organizations have reported on the controversy including the Natural Resources Defense Council in support of the cancelation of the project and John Stossel in support of the development of the mine. , the mine remains a controversial topic.

See also
 Earth Day
 Environmental policy of the Donald Trump administration
 MyEnvironment – EPA Environmental indicator search by neighborhood

References

Further reading

 Bosso, Christopher. Environment, Inc.: From Grassroots to Beltway. Lawrence, KS: University of Kansas Press, 2005
 Bosso, Christopher, and Deborah Guber. "Maintaining Presence: Environmental Advocacy and the Permanent Campaign." pp. 78–99 in Environmental Policy: New Directions for the Twenty First Century, 6th ed., eds. Norman Vig and Michael Kraft. Washington, DC: CQ Press, 2006
 Brooks, Karl Boyd, ed. The Environmental Legacy of Harry S. Truman (Truman State University Press, 2009).
 Carter, Neil. The Politics of the Environment: Ideas, Activism, Policy, 2nd ed. Cambridge, UK: Cambridge University Press, 2007
 Davies, Kate. The Rise of the U.S. Environmental Health Movement (2013). Lanham, MD: Rowman & Littlefield
 Demortain, David, The Science of Bureaucracy: Risk Decision-Making and the US Environmental Protection Agency. The MIT Press, 2020
 
 Hays, Samuel P. A history of environmental politics since 1945 (2000)
 Hays, Samuel P. Beauty, Health, and Permanence: Environmental Politics in the United States, 1955-1985 (1989)
 Richardson, Elmo. Dams, Parks and Politics: Resource Development and Preservation the Truman-Eisenhower Era (1973).
 
 EPA Alumni Association, "Protecting the Environment, A Half Century of Progress" – an overview of EPA's environmental protection efforts over 50 years
 EPA Alumni Association individual Half Century of Progress reports for air, water, pesticides, drinking water, waste management, Superfund, and toxic substances

External links

 
 Environmental Protection Agency in the Federal Register
 Environmental Protection Agency on USAspending.gov

United States Environmental Protection Agency
Environmental agencies in the United States
Environmental protection agencies

1970 establishments in Washington, D.C.
1970 in the environment
Government agencies established in 1970
Regulators of biotechnology products
Federal law enforcement agencies of the United States
Environmental policies organizations
Environmental policy in the United States
Organizations based in Washington, D.C.